Aleksander Dziewa is a Polish basketball player for Śląsk Wrocław of the PLK.

Early life
Aleksander Dziewa played chess regularly until he enrolled in middle school. He started basketball at age 16.

Club career
Dziewa started his club career with Śląsk Wrocław in the I Liga.

The 2018–19 I Liga season was a turning point for him. In the first match against KKS Pro-Basket Kutno, he scored 28 points. Then, excluding one game, he regularly scored around 20 points. His "favorite" rival was SKK Siedlce, against whom he averaged 38 points in both matches. This achievement was especially noteworthy as Dziewa's coach Radosław Hyży took Dziewa out of the game early in order to give other players time to develop.

Throughout the season, Dziewa averaged 22.2 points and 9.7 rebounds per meeting. In the last match against SKK Siedlce, his efficiency index was as high as 46.

He was one of the cornerstones of the team that promoted to the Polish Basketball League in 2019.

With Śląsk Wrocław, as one of the key players Dziewa helped defeat Legia Warszawa 86:85 in extra time for the bronze medal match. The result superseded expectations. For this final game of the season, Dziewa praised the performance of both Elijah Stewart and Strahinja Jovanovic.

National team
In the summer of 2018, Aleksander Dziewa was called up to the Polish national team B, with which he played several matches in China.

Because of Dziewa's strong performances in the national league, head coach Mike Taylor appointed Dziewa for the Polish main national team for the victorious 2019 FIBA Basketball World Cup qualification games against Croatia and the Netherlands.

References

External links
FIBA profile 
Profile at league website
Profile at Eurobasket.com
Proballers profile

1997 births
Living people
Centers (basketball)
People from Konin
Polish men's basketball players
Power forwards (basketball)
Śląsk Wrocław basketball players